Coleophora felixella is a moth of the family Coleophoridae. It has only been found in Armenia and the northern Caucasus.

References

felixella
Moths described in 1994